Okenia distincta is a species of sea slug, specifically a dorid nudibranch, a marine gastropod mollusc in the family Goniodorididae.

Distribution
This species was described from northern Honshu, Japan. It is known from northern Japan north to Peter the Great Bay, Russia.

Description
This Okenia has a narrow body and up to ten pairs of short lateral papillae. There are many papillae on the back, between the rhinophores and the gills and two in front of the rhinophores. The body is translucent and has some small spots of brown and white pigment. It is similar in shape and arrangement of the papillae to Okenia angelensis, Okenia harastii, Okenia zoobotryon and Okenia mija.

Ecology
The diet of this species is a bryozoan, a species of Amathia.

References

Goniodorididae
Gastropods described in 1940